Sundae in New York is a 1983 American animated short film directed by Jimmy Picker and starring Scott Record.

Summary
A variety show featuring caricatures of New York personalities including then mayor Ed Koch to the tune of Theme from New York, New York.

Accolades
The film won the Academy Award for Best Animated Short Film at the 56th Academy Awards, beating out Mickey's Christmas Carol, the Disney animated short that was also nominated for the same award that year.

The Academy Film Archive preserved Sundae in New York in 2006.

See also
New York, New York-the 1977 Martin Scorsese film that the theme originated from
Independent animation

References

External links 
 
  on YouTube

1983 films
1983 animated films
1980s animated short films
American animated short films
Best Animated Short Academy Award winners
Films set in New York City
1980s English-language films
1980s American films